America's Original Sin: Racism, White Privilege, and the Bridge to a New America is a 2015 book by Jim Wallis.

Summary
The book calls for Americans to overcome racism in the United States, issuing an appeal rooted in fundamental Christian values. It argues in favor of telling the truth about the American past, suggesting that this is essential to national redemption. The book also discusses the concept of white privilege, arguing that it constitutes a sin.

See also
Dear White People
Black Lives Matter
White People – 2015 film exploring white privilege

Further reading

References

External links

2015 non-fiction books
American non-fiction books
English-language books
Racism in the United States
Non-fiction books about racism
Works about White Americans
White privilege
Identity politics